Island Harbour is one of the fourteen Districts of Anguilla.  Its population at the 2011 census was 988.

Education
There is one government school in the town, Vivian Vanterpool Primary School. Albena Lake-Hodge Comprehensive School in The Valley serves secondary students.

Demographics

Politics 

The incumbent is Othlyn Vanterpool of the Anguilla United Front.

References

Populated places in Anguilla